Donavon may refer to:

Donavon Frankenreiter (born 1972), American musician and surfer
Donavon Frankenreiter (album), debut album by Donavon Frankenreiter
Donavon, Saskatchewan, hamlet in Montrose Rural Municipality 315, Saskatchewan, Canada

See also
Donavan (disambiguation)
Donovan (disambiguation)